Şinasi Şahingiray (born 31 July 1905, date of death unknown) was a Turkish sprinter. He competed in the men's 100 metres at the 1928 Summer Olympics. He was twenty-two years old when he competed, and ranked fourth in the 100 Metre Dash. His personal best time for the 100 Metre Dash was 11.4 seconds.

References

1905 births
Year of death missing
Athletes (track and field) at the 1928 Summer Olympics
Turkish male sprinters
Olympic athletes of Turkey
Place of birth missing
20th-century Turkish people